Dimethylaniline monooxygenase [N-oxide-forming] 2 is an enzyme that in humans is encoded by the FMO2 gene.

The flavin-containing monooxygenases are NADPH-dependent enzymes that catalyze the oxidation of many drugs and xenobiotics. In most mammals, there is a flavin-containing monooxygenase that catalyzes the N-oxidation of some primary alkylamines through an N-hydroxylamine intermediate. However, in humans, this enzyme is truncated and is probably rapidly degraded. The protein encoded by this gene represents the truncated form and apparently has no catalytic activity. A functional allele found in African Americans has been reported, but no sequence evidence has been deposited to support the finding. This gene is found in a cluster with the FMO1, FMO3, and FMO4 genes on chromosome 1.

References

Further reading